Goodlowtown is a historically African American section of Lexington, Kentucky. It was named for William Cassius Goodloe.

It is located in a bottomland area.

Horse jockey Isaac Burns Murphy was a resident.

References

Lexington–Fayette metropolitan area

African-American society